Zaitovo (Zäyet) is a rural locality (a village) in Tryapinsky Selsoviet, Aurgazinsky District, Bashkortostan, Russia. The population was 178 as of 2010. There are 5 streets.

Geography 
Zaitovo is located 23 km northeast of Tolbazy (the district's administrative centre) by road. Tryapino is the nearest rural locality.

References 

Rural localities in Aurgazinsky District